Boadella reservoir is a reservoir located on the Muga river, near Darnius, Catalonia, Spain. The dam is located at Darnius while the main water body is also within the boundaries of Sant Llorenç de la Muga, Terrades and Maçanet de Cabrenys. Despite giving it its name to the reservoir, the municipality of Boadella i les Escaules is not located within its boundaries. The construction of the hydroelectric dam was completed in 1969 and was designed by chief engineer Eugenio Pinedo, creating a reservoir with a storage capacity of 60.2 hm³. The dam has a structural height of 63 m and a crest length of 250 m.

See also
List of dams and reservoirs in Catalonia

References

External links
Darnius Official Website 
Weekly storage summary of Pantà de Boadella 
Boadella Reservoir - Consorci Salines Bassegoda

Reservoirs in Catalonia
Alt Empordà